The Region Chief Minister or State Chief Minister serves as the chief executive of each of the respective regional or state governments of Myanmar. According to the Constitution of Myanmar, the Chief Minister is responsible for forming the state and regional governments, and for signing and promulgating bills approved by the State and Region Hluttaws.

Qualifications
Chief Ministers must be at least 35 years old and meet the qualifications of Pyithu Hluttaw representatives. They are appointed by the President of Myanmar. Chief Ministers must be selected from representatives of the respective regional or state assemblies as prescribed in the constitution, although a notable exception to this ruling was the appointment of General Maung Maung Ohn as the Chief Minister of Rakhine State in June 2014.

Government office 
The Region or State Administration Department functions as the Region or State government. The Region or State Department of General Administration is also the office of the Region or State Mission.

Current Chief Ministers

List of Chief Ministers

Ayeyarwady Region

Bago Region

Magway Region

Mandalay Region

Sagaing Region

Tanintharyi Region

Yangon Region

Chin State

Kachin State

Kayah State

Kayin State

Mon State

Rakhine State

Shan State

References

Lists of office-holders
State and region governments of Myanmar

Region or state chief ministers of Myanmar